Keng Hkam  is a village in Mong Kung Township in the Shan State of Burma. It is located by the Nam Pang River.

Keng Hkam will be one of the communities impacted by the Tasang Dam project.

History

Prior to the end of World War II, the town of Keng Hkam was the capital of Kenghkam State.

References

Populated places in Shan State